Dalea carnea, commonly known as pink tassels, is a flowering plant species named for its small, pink-to-white flowers. It is also known as whitetassels or pink prairie clover. The plant is a perennial herb in the family Fabaceae. Its habitats include mesic flatwoods, open meadows, and pine rocklands.

References

carnea
Endemic flora of the United States
Flora of the Southeastern United States
Flora without expected TNC conservation status